Borgo Val di Taro, usually referred to as Borgotaro, (locally ) is a town and comune in Emilia, Italy, in the Province of Parma,  from the city of Parma.

Borgo Val di Taro is an important centre for cattle husbandry in Emilia and it is one of the zones where Parmigiano-Reggiano is produced.

The area is well known for its Boletus edulis (porcini) mushrooms, and several boletes that grow there have IGP (English: PGI) status.

James Gandolfini Sr., father of Italian-American actor James Gandolfini Jr., was born in Borgo Val di Taro.

Main sights

Not far from the town is the small church of S. Antonio del Viennese, a 13th-century structure in brick. The city hall (palazzo comunale), in the Lombard Gothic style, is a work of the 14th century.

Tourism and gastronomic tours are important factors of the modern economy. The town is a member of the Cittaslow (slow city) movement.

Frazioni
Banca, Barca, Barzana di Sotto, Baselica, Belforte, Bissaio, Boceto, Bozzi, Brattesini, Brunelli, Ca' Valesi, Cafaraccia, Capitelli, Caprendino, Case Maroni, Case Scodellino, Case Vighen, Casembola, Casoni, Cavanna, Cianica, Corriago, Costadasi, Frasso, Galla, Ghiare, Giacopazzi, Grifola, Il Mulino, Il Poggio, Laghina, Lavacchielli, Le Spiagge, Magrano, Meda, Monticelli, Ostia Parmense, Poggio, Pontolo, Porcigatone, Pozzo, Roccamurata, Rovinaglia, San Martino, San Pietro, San Vincenzo, Testanello, Tiedoli, Tombone, Valdena, Valleto

International relations

Twin towns — sister cities
Borgo Val di Taro is twinned with:

References

Official site 

Cittaslow